Willie Nile (1980) is the self-titled debut album by the New York singer/songwriter of the same name. Released by Arista Records in early 1980 to critical praise, it was produced and engineered by Roy Halee and featured Jay Dee Daugherty, formerly with Patti Smith, on drums. The album immediately created a buzz among critics and quickly drew the attention of other rock stars such as Pete Townshend and The Who, who invited Nile to join them on their Summer of 1980 US tour.

Critical reviews 
Los Angeles Times pop music critic Robert Hilburn described the album as "the kind of rare collection that reawakens you to the inspiring qualities of rock'n'roll".
With London Calling by The Clash, the album was voted record of the year for 1980 by Stereo Review magazine.
Music critic David Okamoto wrote "his self-titled debut remains one of the most thrilling post-Byrds folk-rock albums of all time".
Uncut: "Every song spins superb hooks with a Buddy Holly flair".

Track listing

Personnel
 Willie Nile – Electric and Acoustic guitar, piano, vocals
Clay Barnes – Electric Guitar, background vocals
Peter Hoffman - Electric Guitar
Tom Ethridge - Bass
Jay Dee Daugherty – Drums, Percussion
Mark Johnson – Background vocals

Charts

Other references
That's the Reason is heard at the end credits of the 1981 film Private Lessons.

Production
Producers: Roy Halee
Engineering: Roy Halee
Remixing: Phil Jamtaas, Record Plant, Los Angeles
Mastering:  Greg Calbi, Sterling Sound, New York, NY
Cover photo: Christine Olympia Rodin
Photography: John Noonan, Ron Kellum
Art Direction: Ron Kellum

References

1980 debut albums
Albums produced by Roy Halee
Albums recorded at Record Plant (New York City)
Arista Records albums
Willie Nile albums